Susanna Bonfiglio (born 8 September 1974) is an Italian former basketball player who competed in the 1996 Summer Olympics. She also played for the Phoenix Mercury of the Women's National Basketball Association (WNBA).

References

1974 births
Living people
Italian women's basketball players
Olympic basketball players of Italy
Basketball players at the 1996 Summer Olympics
Phoenix Mercury players
20th-century Italian women